Bạch is a Vietnamese language surname, which means "white". The name is transliterated as Bai in Chinese, and as Baek (also often spelled Baik, Paek or Paik) in Korean. Bach may be an anglicized variation of Bạch. The surname may refer to:

Bạch Liêu (1236–1315), Vietnamese official
Bạch Hưng Khang (born 1942), Vietnamese scientist
Bạch Thái Bưởi (1874–1932), Vietnamese businessman
Bạch Xuân Nguyên (died 1833), Vietnamese official
Trần Bạch Đằng (1926–2007), Vietnamese politician

Other uses
Bạch Hổ oil field
Bạch Long Vĩ island
Bạch Mã National Park
Battle of Bạch Đằng (disambiguation)
Trúc Bạch Lake

References

Vietnamese-language surnames